Josef Kratochvíl known as Kráťa (9 February 1905 – 8 July 1984) was a Czechoslovak footballer. He played 20 games and scored 4 goals for the Czechoslovakia national football team. He was also part of Czechoslovakia's squad at the 1924 Olympics, but he did not play in any matches.

At the end of his active football career Kratochvíl moved to Switzerland in 1931. He joined FC Basel's first team during their 1931–32 season soon after Otto Haftl had taken over as coach. Haftl and Kratochvíl had played together for Teplitzer FK in 1930. Kratochvíl played just two matches for Basel, the first being the test match on New Year's Day 1932 as the team lost 3–4 against Freiburger FC. Kratochvíl also played one domestic league match for the club, this being the home game in the Landhof on 24 January as Basel were defeated 0–3 by Zürich.

References

Sources
 Rotblau: Jahrbuch Saison 2014/2015. Publisher: FC Basel Marketing AG. 
 Die ersten 125 Jahre. Publisher: Josef Zindel im Friedrich Reinhardt Verlag, Basel. 
 Verein "Basler Fussballarchiv" Homepage

1905 births
1984 deaths
Czech footballers
Czechoslovak footballers
Czechoslovak expatriate footballers
Czechoslovakia international footballers
Olympic footballers of Czechoslovakia
Footballers at the 1924 Summer Olympics
SK Slavia Prague players
SK Kladno players
FC Basel players
Association football forwards
Sportspeople from Kladno
Expatriate footballers in Switzerland
Czechoslovak expatriate sportspeople in Switzerland